Jose Cornelius White (March 2, 1973 – October 2019) was an American football defensive tackle who played two seasons with the Jacksonville Jaguars of the National Football League. He was drafted by the Minnesota Vikings in the seventh round of the 1995 NFL Draft. He played college football at Howard University and attended Howard D. Woodson High School in Washington, D.C. White was also a member of the Buffalo Destroyers of the Arena Football League.

References

External links
Just Sports Stats

1973 births
2019 deaths
Players of American football from Washington, D.C.
American football defensive ends
Howard Bison football players
Jacksonville Jaguars players
Buffalo Destroyers players
H. D. Woodson High School alumni